The name RenderMan can cause confusion because it has been used to refer to different things developed by Pixar Animation Studios:

 RenderMan Interface Specification (RISpec), an open API (technical specification) developed by Pixar for a standard communications protocol (or interface) between 3D computer graphics programs and rendering programs to describe three-dimensional scenes and turn them into digital photorealistic images
 RenderMan Shading Language, a component of the RenderMan Interface Specification used to define shaders
 Pixar RenderMan, a RenderMan Interface Specification-compliant rendering software system developed by Pixar based on their own interface specification
 RenderMan, also commonly used to refer to other renderers because of their compliance with the RenderMan standard